Allen Township is the name of two townships in U.S. state of Indiana:

 Allen Township, Miami County, Indiana
 Allen Township, Noble County, Indiana

Indiana township disambiguation pages